Singed Wings is a lost 1922 American silent romantic drama film directed by Penrhyn Stanlaws and starring Bebe Daniels. Famous Players-Lasky served as producers with the usual released through Paramount Pictures.

Cast
Bebe Daniels as Bonita della Guerda
Conrad Nagel as Peter Gordon
Adolphe Menjou as Bliss Gordon
Robert Brower as Don José della Guerda
Ernest Torrence as Emilio, a clown
Mabel Trunnelle as Eve Gordon

References

External links

 Lobby poster

1922 films
American silent feature films
Lost American films
Paramount Pictures films
Films based on short fiction
American romantic drama films
American black-and-white films
1922 romantic drama films
Films based on works by Katharine Newlin Burt
1922 lost films
Films directed by Penrhyn Stanlaws
1920s American films
Silent romantic drama films
Silent American drama films
1920s English-language films